The Cascade Center at the Riverplex is an indoor and outdoor shopping, dining, and entertainment complex located in downtown New Castle, Pennsylvania, opened in 2006. Much of the complex sits on the former site of the Cascade, the first movie theater of the Warner Bros. The complex is at the corner of East Washington Street and Mill Street. As of 2013, the complex is owned by Riverplex Partners, Inc. The top three stories are rented by Refresh Dental Management as their corporate headquarters.

History
The Warners, residents of nearby Youngstown, Ohio, were sons of Polish Jews wanting to break into the then-fledgling film business. The brothers, after successfully showing a used copy of The Great Train Robbery at Idora Park in Youngstown, traveled to New Castle to screen the movie in a vacant store on the site of what would become the Cascade Center. This makeshift theatre, called the Bijou, was furnished with chairs borrowed from a local undertaker. In 1906, the brothers purchased a small theater in New Castle near the Bijou, which they called the Cascade Movie Palace, taking its name from nearby Cascade Park. They maintained the theater until moving into film distribution in 1907.

Gradually over time, the building that housed the Bijou would host other business while the Cascade itself would eventually be demolished to make way for a parking lot. The buildings themselves became abandoned by the 1980s when New Castle, like most other Rust Belt cities, saw the collapse of the steel industry having a ripple effect in the region with the population dropping as well as the general suburbanization effect that had been happening throughout the United States since the 1950s.

By the mid-1990s, only two businesses were open on the site that would become the Cascade Center. One of them, Main Street Clothiers & Custom Tailors, is a men's suit shop that was housed in the building that also housed the Bijou. The other would be the B&O Railroad Federal Credit Union, a credit union that was in a separate purpose-built building on the site bordering Mill Street and the Neshannock Creek and had actually been built on the site of the Cascade after the site was used as a parking lot.

In 1996, parts of the wall of the building that housed the Bijou collapsed onto East Washington Street, one of the cities main thoroughfares. The portion that collapsed was next door to Main Street Clothiers, which had just opened three years before on the site. The city of New Castle was very close to issuing a condemnation notice to the building, but at the 11th hour the building's historical significance was discovered, saving the building. The city then announced redevelopment plans to make it what would eventually become the Cascade Center.

Development
The city took most of the property by eminent domain and stabilized the parts of the wall that had collapsed, closing off the sidewalk in front of the building to prevent accidents until the wall could be completely rebuilt. The city was later able to persuade the B&O Credit Union—now the First Choice Federal Credit Union—to temporarily move into the nearby mall, the Cascade Galleria, so that the property could be bought and made into the Cascade Center. (The credit union eventually moved out of the mall back into their own building out in neighboring Union Township.) Main Street Clothiers was allowed to stay in the building where they remain today, and although their portion of the building is not officially part of the Cascade Center they do advertise in the complex, and have even expanded their business by screen-printing T-shirts as well as serving as the area's J. C. Penney Catalog Center after Rite Aid acquired Eckerd Pharmacy in 2007 and ended the J. C. Penney Catalog Center's in the former Eckerd locations after they were converted to Rite Aid. Coincidentally, Main Street sits next door to a former J. C. Penney (not the side that had the wall collapse) that is currently being remodeled and eventually having a coffee shop open in the building.

Although the downtown streets & sidewalks were rebuilt in the early 2000s to resemble the turn of the 19th century, the complex itself wouldn't begin reconstruction until 2003 and was completed in 2006. The interiors of the existing buildings were completely gutted out while the site of the Cascade itself was completely rebuilt into a close replication of the Cascade. Both the old sections and the newly built sections are like one building inside. The city was also able to acquire the former Mellon Bank parking lot and rebuild it as the parking lot for downtown in general and the Cascade Center specifically. The alley that ran along Neshannock Creek behind the buildings was permanently closed and added on to the property of the complex, which became a promenade that leads to an outdoor amphitheater between the former J. C. Penney building and the creek along East Washington Street. The northern terminus of Pennsylvania Route 65 (which runs along East Washington Street) was extended over a mile to near the complex on the other side of the creek.

Much like Station Square in Pittsburgh, the complex is an example of adaptive reuse, and focuses on the early years of motion pictures much like Station Square focuses on trains. The complex largely remains vacant, although businesses have started to open up and events being held both inside the complex and at the amphitheater. The complex has also help draw businesses to downtown.

Despite the historical connection to the Warner Bros. studio, the complex has no association with Warner Bros. Discovery, the current parent company of Warner Bros. Entertainment. Cass Warner, the granddaughter of Harry Warner, did visit the complex just before it officially opened in 2006.

Tenants
Although at one point the complex had three tenants, in 2010 all three closed for unknown reasons and the complex was put up for sale. The outdoor promenade and amphitheater, which are publicly owned, are still used by the city for downtown events.
 
Main Street Clothiers and Custom Tailors, while in the building where the Cascade Center is located, is not an official part of the complex, since it has outdoor access only instead of indoor access like the rest of the businesses and also was pre-existing before the creation of the complex.

Reinvestment in the center has picked up in recent years, with the Two Rivers Coffee Shop and The Commonwealth restaurant both opening in 2014.

References

Urban planning
Buildings and structures in Lawrence County, Pennsylvania
Tourist attractions in Lawrence County, Pennsylvania
New Castle, Pennsylvania